The 2004 Nunavut general election was held on February 16, 2004, to elect the 19 members of the 2nd Legislative Assembly of Nunavut.

Premier Paul Okalik asked for the five-year-old territory's first parliament to be dissolved on January 16.

The territory operates on a consensus government system with no political parties; the premier is subsequently chosen by and from the MLAs. There were 11,285 registered voters at the time of the election call.

Issues

Issues at the election included:

the size of the civil service;
the territory's Human Rights Act;
education;
language and culture.

Results 

Elections were held in 18 of the 19 electoral districts. Rankin Inlet North acclaimed its MLA. The following is a list of the districts with their candidates.

Source: Results (CBC News)

In the main, Nunavummiut decided to stay with their present legislature. The premier, four cabinet ministers, and three other MLAs were re-elected; five incumbents were defeated, including former speaker of the house Kevin O'Brien. Only two women were elected to the 19-seat legislature.

Premier Paul Okalik was given a firm endorsement by the voters in his riding. He faced a strong challenge for the premier's job from Tagak Curley, who was acclaimed to his seat. However, Okalik was returned to the premiership on March 5, 2004, by the new legislature.

Miscellaneous 

For the first time, residents of several tiny, isolated communities were able to vote by satellite phone.

Voter turnout was nearly 90%; in 8 of the 18 ridings it was higher than 100% (as high as 134% in Kugluktuk) since there was no door-to-door enumeration and voter registration is permitted at the polling station.

References

External links
Elections Nunavut
CBC: Nunavut Votes 2004
Nunavut Legislative Assembly
About Nunavut
About Consensus Government (Government of the Northwest Territories)

2004
Nunavut general
2004 in Nunavut
February 2004 events in Canada